Merry Christmas from Harmony Ranch is a studio recording released by the Western band Riders in the Sky in 1992.  It is available as a single CD.

Track listing
 "Here Comes Santa Claus" (Gene Autry, Oakley Haldeman) – 1:38
 "Silver Bells" (Jay Livingston, Ray Evans) – 2:43
 "Rudolph the Red-Nosed Reindeer" – 2:16
 "White Christmas" (Irving Berlin) – 3:18
 "Navidad y Año Nuevo" (Navarro) – 2:49
 "Christmas Time's A-Coming" (Logan) – 2:11
 "Deck the Bunkhouse Walls" – 0:32
 "Sidemeat's Christmas Goose" (Douglas Green) – 2:44
 "Riding Home on Christmas Eve" (Green) – 2:44
 "Merry Christmas from Harmony Ranch/Jingle Bells" – 2:10
 "Christmas Carol Medley/Greatest Gifts" – 7:17

Personnel
Douglas B. Green (a.k.a. Ranger Doug) – vocals, guitar
Paul Chrisman (a.k.a. Woody Paul) – vocals, fiddle
Fred LaBour (a.k.a. Too Slim) – vocals, string bass

References / Sources
Riders in the Sky Official Website

1992 Christmas albums
Christmas albums by American artists
Country Christmas albums
Riders in the Sky (band) albums
MCA Records albums
Folk Christmas albums